Michelle Edith-Hager (née Capes, born 3 October 1966) is an Australian  field hockey player who competed in the 1988 Summer Olympics and in the 1992 Summer Olympics. In the 1988 Summer Olympics she won a gold medal as part of the Australian national hockey team.

Personal life
Michelle married fellow Australian hockey Olympian Mark Hager. Her sister Lee Capes, brother-in-law Michael Nobbs and niece Kaitlin Nobbs also represented the nation at the games.

References

External links
 

1966 births
Living people
Australian female field hockey players
Olympic field hockey players of Australia
Field hockey players at the 1988 Summer Olympics
Field hockey players at the 1992 Summer Olympics
Olympic gold medalists for Australia
Olympic medalists in field hockey
Medalists at the 1988 Summer Olympics
Field hockey players from Perth, Western Australia
Sportspeople from Fremantle
20th-century Australian women